The Snowslide Range is a mountain range in northwestern British Columbia, Canada, located west of the Bell-Irving River, between Treaty Creek in the south and Teigen Creek in the north.

See also
List of mountain ranges

References

Boundary Ranges
Mountain ranges of British Columbia